San Carlos is a beachfront subdivision within the port city of Guaymas, but is considered its own town in the northern state of Sonora in Mexico. It is known for the clarity and warmth of the ocean water in its shallow bays. It lies on the Sea of Cortez. Given the size of the city, with nearly 7,000 inhabitants, there is a large number of RV parks, resorts and stores available. There is also an active diving community. Many Americans and Canadians live in San Carlos during the winter months. The summer months are very hot and humid. Fishing, scuba dive, and beach activities can be pursued here. Another widespread sport in San Carlos is sailing but you can also decide to skydive over the Sea of Cortez.

San Carlos is about a six-hour drive from the United States along the Mexican interstate Highway 15.

History and legal background
The community of San Carlos was founded on land that previously was a large cattle ranch known as the Baviso de Navarro. This was later subdivided in four great estates known as Rancho Los Algodones, Rancho San Carlos, Rancho El Baviso and Rancho El Represo. In the mid-1950s, Mr. Rafael T. Caballero acquired the ranches Los Algodones, San Carlos and El Baviso, contracting the services of City planners who designed the first stages of a gradual and carefully planned tourist development that in time would become one of the first and most important tourist and recreational communities in the State.

When the private investors began the initial works for this development, in support of this vision, the State Congress of Sonora during the governorship of Luis Encinas Johnson issued a declaration establishing the official incorporation of the Township of San Carlos, Nuevo Guaymas, Municipality of Guaymas, Sonora, Mexico, through a Decree published on 28 September 1963, with an endowment of 27.746 square kilometres of privately owned lands located in the Southern portion of the estate Ranch El Baviso.

To complement the Township Land Endowment, the State Congress, during the office of Governor Faustino Felix Serna, increased the Legal Land Fund by adding the estates known as Ranch San Carlos and Ranch Los Algodones, both with a surface of 22.04 km2, as published in the Official State Bulletin no. 23, on 21 March 1973. A total of 49.79 km2 of privately owned lands constitute the territorial reserves of this development.

On 1 July 1976, The Agrarian reform Secretariat, through the Director of Legal Affaires, declared by means of official notification no. 240-438155, Reference XV; that the mentioned privately owned lands located in the remaining lands of the estates El Baviso and San Carlos, have no agrarian legal claims upon them, and consequently the proprietors are free to lien, to encumber, to contribute to societies, to merge, to cede on trusteeship and to freely dispose of these lands. In that same official notice it is recognized that the proprietors of these four estates, voluntarily ceded to the Federal Government part of their lands for the creation of the new center of population and for the formation of the Ejido 13 July, affecting the Northern and the western portions of the estates San Carlos, El Baviso, Los Algodones and El Represo. The above in accordance to the Presidential Resolution of 15 July 1968, was published in the Official Gazette of the Federation on 27 August 1968.

In support of the objectives set forth by the private investors for the development of a new tourist destination, the Agrarian Reform Secretariat, the Secretary of Human Settlements and Public Works, and the Secretary of Tourism, altogether issued a Declaration of High-priority Tourist Zoning, for all the effects of law; in favor of the estates' El Baviso, San Carlos and Los Algodones, owned by Grupo Caballero. The cited declaration was published in the Official Gazette of the Federation No. 34 on 15 August 1980.

Politics, motion pictures and tourism

In the State of Sonora as well as its personable cities and towns, is a diversity of 'real time' leisure attractions, as well as a strong historical perspective. Filled with great presidential traditions, Guaymas is the birthplace of three former Republic of Mexico presidents: Abelardo Rodriguez, Plutarco Elías Calles and Adolfo de la Huerta.

San Carlos has been used for many films, including:

The classic film Catch-22, starring Alan Arkin, Orson Welles, Martin Sheen, Bob Newhart, Anthony Perkins.
The Mask of Zorro - starring Antonio Banderas, Anthony Hopkins & Catherine Zeta-Jones
Lucky Lady - starring Liza Minnelli
Camaroneros - Mexican production starring Erick del Castillo
 Spanish language soap opera Por Tu Amor

The hotel/resorts of Club Med (now closed) and the San Carlos Plaza were built on beach frontage. A major alternative to the hotels in San Carlos are vacation rentals.

Scuba diving in the area
The waters of the Gulf of California in the San Carlos area offer a multitude of diving opportunities at all skill levels year-round. Average surface temperatures are 85 °F(29.4 °C)-90 °F(32.2 °C) (often even warmer) June–August, 80 °F(26.6 °C)-89 °F(31.6 °C) September and October, 63 °F(17.2 °C)-71 °F(21.6 °C) in the winter months November–March, Then warms-up again 72 °F(22.2 °C)-77 °F(25 °C) in April and May.

Underwater visibility of over 100 ft. (30m) is very common. Sometimes visibility exceeds 200 ft. (61 m) as is often the case at San Pedro Nolasco Island. However, a consultation with a local shop dive shop or divemaster is recommended, and can provide accurate and detailed information on current conditions at specific dive sites.

Popular dive sites
 San Pedro Nolasco Island
 Martini Cove
 Catalina Island
 Double Point
 Eagle Rock
 The Three Marias
 Cautin
 Frenchie's Cove
 Lalo Cove
 Zorro Cove
 San Antonio Point
 Kevin's Rock
 Emerald Bay
 Painted Rocks
 San Luis Island
 Deer Island
 Window Rock
 Sea Mount
 San Nicolas Island
 Honeymoon Island

References

External links
 What's Up San Carlos Travel Guide to San Carlos and Guaymas Sonora
 International Computer Solutions Computer Help in San Carlos, Guaymas, and Empalme
 The San Carlos Computer Club Listen to the live streamed meeting every Tuesday at 9:15am and find previous meetings at this blog.

Resorts in Mexico
Geography of Sonora